is a Japanese singer-songwriter, musician, actor, and writer.

Career

Music
From its formation in 2000 until its disbandment in 2015, Hoshino led the instrumental band Sakerock, where he played marimba and guitar. They released over ten albums. As a solo artist, he debuted with his first album Baka no Uta on June 23, 2010. His first physical single, "Kudaranai no Naka ni" was released on March 2, 2011 and peaked at number 17 on the Oricon Singles Chart. The subsequent singles – "Film", "Yume no Soto e", "Shiranai" (2012), and "Gag" (2013) – all charted in the top 10. His second album, Episode, released on September 28, 2011, peaked at number five. His third album, Stranger, released on May 1, 2013, peaked at number two on the Oricon Albums Chart and was certified gold by the Recording Industry Association of Japan.

Since 2011, he's been co-hosting a Ustream program called  together with Ichirō Yamaguchi of Sakanaction. In 2014 the program officially changed its name to Yoru no Television.

His fourth album, Yellow Dancer, was released on December 2, 2015 in Japan on Speedstar Records, and debuted atop the Oricon and Billboard Album charts. Yellow Dancer was certified platinum by the RIAJ for physical shipments, and became one of the few albums to receive a gold certification for digital downloads.

His fifth album, Pop Virus, was released on December 17, 2018. It topped the Oricon Album charts four weeks in a row and was certified double platinum by the RIAJ one month after its release. The commercial success of the album, within a couple of months, earned him a Best Album prize at the 33rd Japan Gold Disc Awards, alongside a Best Song prize for the digital success of the single, and asadora theme song, "Idea". He also became the first artist to win a total of four trophies at the Space Shower Music Awards of 2019. On August 30, 2019, all of his music was made available on streaming services.

On February 18, 2018, Hoshino uploaded a music video of his song "Doraemon", which served as a tribute song for the Japanese franchise of the same name. It was used as the theme to the 38th Doraemon movie, Nobita's Treasure Island, and, since fall 2019, has been used as the current opening theme of the Doraemon anime.

In April 2022, his song Comedy was used as the ending to the first season of the anime adaptation of Spy x Family.

His most recent song, "I Wanna Be Your Ghost", was used in 'Yokaipedia' as its main theme.

Acting
Hoshino's movie debut, Lee Sang-il's 69, was an adaptation of the Ryū Murakami novel of the same name. He previously acted in various television dramas and stage plays. In 2012, he debuted as a voice actor, voicing Buddha in the original video animation (OVA) adaptation of Hikaru Nakamura's manga Saint Young Men, and also provided a theme song called "Gag" for its 2013 theatrical version, where he reprised his role. In 2013, he played the lead character in Masahide Ichii's  alongside Kaho, and starred in the Sion Sono film Why Don't You Play in Hell?. In 2016, Hoshino starred in TBS's The Full-Time Wife Escapist. With Yui Aragaki as his co-star, he portrayed a salaryman named Hiramasa Tsuzaki. The drama achieved steadily rising ratings, with a real-time viewership peak rating of 20.8% on the final episode, and an overall rating of 14.5%. Hoshino's performance earned him several Best Supporting Actor awards. He also provided the theme song for the drama, titled "Koi".

Gen Hoshino created the parody character "Akira Nise" (ニセ明, Nise Akira, literally Fake Akira) as a tribute to Akira Fuse.

In 2017, Hoshino lent his voice to the main character of award-winning animated film Night Is Short, Walk On Girl. He also became the voice of the Father in Mamoru Hosoda's Mirai, which was released into theaters in Japan on July 20, 2018.

Idaten, NHK's 2019 Taiga drama, chosen for the theme to encourage the Tokyo 2020 Olympic Games, Hoshino portrayed Kazushige Hirasawa, who delivered the persuasive speech that helped determine the venue for the Tokyo 1964 Olympic Games.

On April 30, 2018, it was announced that Hoshino will star in Samurai Shifters, the film adaptation of Akihiro Dobashi's historical novel Hikkoshi Daimyo Sanzenri, set to premier on August 30, 2019. In the movie, he plays a bookworm samurai called Harunosuke Katagiri, who receives the mission to help a daimyo move. It will be Hoshino's first lead role in a live-action movie since Blindly in Love in 2013.

Personal life
On December 22, 2012, Hoshino was diagnosed with a subarachnoid hemorrhage and underwent surgery. He officially returned to public life on February 28, 2013 with his appearance at the Tokyo J-Wave Awards.

In 2021, Hoshino married actress Yui Aragaki, his co-star in the television series The Full-Time Wife Escapist.

Discography

Baka no Uta (2010)
Episode (2011)
Stranger (2013)
Yellow Dancer (2015)
Pop Virus (2018)

Filmography

Film

Television

Television drama

Variety shows

TV commercials
 NTT DOCOMO, "ZeniCrazy Ver1.0" (February 2019) 
 NTT DOCOMO, "ZeniCrazy Ver2.0" (March 2019)
 Nintendo, "Super Mario Bros. 35th Anniversary" (September 2020)

Original video animation
 Onna no Sono no Hoshi (2022), Hoshi

Concerts and tours
Headlining tours
Baka no Uta Hatsubai Kinen no Live (2010)
Hoshino Gen no Aisatsu Mawari Tour (2010)
Hoshino Gen no Betsu Episode: Heya (2011)
Episode Hatsubai Kinen Tour: Episode 2 Ikou (2012)
Hoshino Gen One-Man no Aki (2012)
Hoshino Gen no Fukkatsu Live Tour (2014)
Hoshino Gen Live Tour 2016: Yellow Voyage (2016)
Hoshino Gen Live Tour 2017: Continues (2017)
Hoshino Gen Dome Tour 2019: Pop Virus (2019)

Concerts
Live in Japan 2018 Gen Hoshino & Mark Ronson

Awards and nominations

References

External links
Official website
 Official Youtube Channel
Official profile at Speedstar Records

1981 births
Japanese male actors
Japanese male pop singers
Japanese male singer-songwriters
Japanese singer-songwriters
Living people
People from Saitama Prefecture
Musicians from Saitama Prefecture
21st-century Japanese singers
Amuse Inc. artists
21st-century Japanese male singers